Schodack Landing Historic District is a national historic district located at Schodack Landing in Rensselaer County, New York.  It consists of 86 contributing buildings located in the hamlet of Schodack Landing.  The district includes a variety of buildings dated from the 18th through early 20th centuries.  They are mostly residential buildings, but include a post office, two churches, a nursing home, a tavern, and a store.  There are notable buildings in the Greek Revival and Italianate styles.

It was listed on the National Register of Historic Places in 1977.

References

Historic districts on the National Register of Historic Places in New York (state)
Greek Revival architecture in New York (state)
Italianate architecture in New York (state)
Buildings and structures in Rensselaer County, New York
National Register of Historic Places in Rensselaer County, New York